Pool of Radiance is a series of role-playing video games set in the Forgotten Realms campaign settings of Dungeons & Dragons; it was the first Dungeons & Dragons video game series to be based on the Advanced Dungeons & Dragons rules.

The series reached combined global sales above 800,000 units by 1996.

Series

Pool of Radiance

Development 
The section of the Forgotten Realms world in which Pool of Radiance takes place was intended to be developed only by SSI. The game was created on Apple II and Commodore 64 computers, taking one year with a team of thirty-five people. This game was the first to use the game engine later used in other SSI D&D games known as the "Gold Box" series. The SSI team developing the game was led by Chuck Kroegel. Kroegel stated that the main challenge with the development was interpreting the AD&D rules to an exact format. Developers also worked to balance the graphics with gameplay to provide a faithful AD&D feel, given the restrictions of a home computer. In addition to the core AD&D manuals, the books Unearthed Arcana and Monster Manual II were also used during development. The game was originally programmed by Keith Brors and Brad Myers, and it was developed by George MacDonald. The game's graphic arts were by Tom Wahl, Fred Butts, Darla Marasco, and Susan Halbleib.

Pool of Radiance was released in June 1988; it was initially available on the Commodore 64, Apple II series and IBM PC compatible computers. A version for the Atari ST was also announced.  The Macintosh version was released in 1989. The Macintosh version featured a slightly different interface and was intended to work on black-and-white Macs like the Mac Plus and the Mac Classic. The screen was tiled into separate windows including the game screen, text console, and compass. Graphics were monochrome and the display window was relatively small compared to other versions. The Macintosh version featured sound, but no music. The game's Amiga version was released two years later. The PC 9800 version 『プール・オブ・レイディアンス』 in Japan was fully translated (like the Japanese Famicom version) and featured full-color graphics. The game was ported to the Nintendo Entertainment System under the title Advanced Dungeons & Dragons: Pool of Radiance, released in April 1992.

The original Pool of Radiance game shipped with a 28-page introductory booklet, which describes secrets relating to the game and the concepts behind it. The booklet guides players through the character creation process, explaining how to create a party. The game also included the 38-page Adventurer's Journal, which provides the game's background. The booklet features depictions of fliers, maps, and information that characters see in the game. The package also included a translation decoder wheel. After the title screen, a copy protection screen was displayed consisting of two pictures and a line. The player was required to use the decoder wheel to line up the pictures, then enter the word revealed on the decoder wheel. After three unsuccessful attempts, the game automatically shut down.

Reception
Generally well received by the gaming press, Pool of Radiance won the Origins Award for "Best Fantasy or Science Fiction Computer Game of 1988". Some reviewers criticized the game's similarities to other contemporary games and its slowness in places, but praised the game's graphics and its role-playing adventure and combat aspects. Also well-regarded was the ability to export player characters from Pool of Radiance to subsequent SSI games in the series.

Curse of the Azure Bonds

The game comes with a manual explaining game play, and an Adventurer's Journal which contains little paragraphs to read at designated points in the game. The game also includes a rune code-wheel for piracy protection; from time to time during play, the player will be asked to enter a letter from the wheel before the characters can journey on.

The game was distributed in the UK by U.S. Gold.

Curse of the Azure Bonds (1989) was the first of three sequels to Pool of Radiance (1988), and was followed by Secret of the Silver Blades (1990) and Pools of Darkness (1991). New adventures for Secret of the Silver Blades may be started by using characters generated in Curse of the Azure Bonds.

This game is closely tied to an AD&D game module and a Forgotten Realms novel by the same name. The adventure module Curse of the Azure Bonds is based on the computer game. Curse of the Azure Bonds was released on the Apple II, Commodore 64, and DOS in 1989, the Amiga and Macintosh in 1990, and the Atari ST in 1991.

Reception
Tony Dillon reviewed the game for CU Amiga-64, scoring it with an overall score of 89%. He commented on the game: "The graphics are more or less the same as PoR, which is no bad thing, and thankfully the game is still as entertaining and involving as the original". He noted that the game's first-person perspective is similar to that of Bard's Tale, and also features an overhead view similar to that of Gauntlet. He concluded the review by stating: "I've said it before [...] but this is brilliant".

Secret of the Silver Blades

Secret of the Silver Blades directly continues the story of Curse of the Azure Bonds. Secret of the Silver Blades does bear similarities to its two predecessors in gameplay and graphics. There is no overworld in this game, however. It takes place entirely in the first person maps.
Graphics did improve slightly, though everything was still drawn in 16 colors.
Mages have the ability to get up to level 7 spells. In particular, the Delayed Blast Fireball is a very useful spell to have in this game. This game also allows mages to actually delay the fireball, unlike Pools of Darkness where it is targeted and immediately cast.
Clerics have the ability to get up to level 6 spells. Raise Dead is still the only option for dead characters, and it drains 1 Constitution point for using it. Heal and Blade Barrier are two popular choices for level 6 spells.
The arrow keys are conveniently usable to select menu options as opposed to using hotkeys, which was the only way in earlier titles, though the hotkey option is still available.
The game received four out of five stars.

Pools of Darkness

Pools of Darkness directly continues the story of Secret of the Silver Blades. Pools of Darkness differed from its predecessors in a number of ways. Unlike the other Forgotten Realms gold box games where the party always stayed in Faerûn, the quests that the party have to endure traversed many dimensions to do battle with Bane's lieutenants. These include Thorne's Cave, Kalistes' Land, a visit to then sleeping Moander's colossus body in Astral Plane, and finally Bane's Land itself in Acheron.
Mages have the ability to get up to level 9 spells (the maximum). A popular spell available in this game is the Delayed Blast Fireball, which can cause damage to many targets at once. Unlike Secret of the Silver Blades, the fireball cannot be delayed and is cast immediately.
Pools of Darkness followed its predecessors closely in terms of structure. The party could have a maximum of six adventurers (with two extra slots for NPCs). Characters had the ability to advance to the lofty heights of level 40, giving them access to tenth-level spells. Combat in Pools of Darkness, especially late in the story, differed greatly from the encounters of the previous games. The player's characters faced some of the toughest creatures in the AD&D universe, in addition to a number of new and formidable critters created specifically for the game, such as the Pets of Kalistes (intelligent magic spiders that could see invisible enemies and whose venomous bite had a -2 save) and the terrifying Minions of Bane (which had the magic resistances of demons and the breath weapons of dragons). The game was by far the most extensive of any of the gold box series, in storyline depth and possibilities of advancement and equipment. The game also featured better graphics at the time as it supported VGA 256 colors instead of 16.
Another minor difference is the font used in the game is less stylish, but easier to read.

Pool of Radiance: Ruins of Myth Drannor

Using the SSI License which restricted Ubisoft's development to D&D games, the company released Pool of Radiance: Ruins of Myth Drannor. The game is not a sequel to any Pool of Radiance game, as per Ubisoft's license, and is only part of the series in name and location.

See also
Azure Bonds
Pools of Darkness (novel)
Pool of Twilight
Pool of Radiance: Attack on Myth Drannor

References

Fantasy video games
Forgotten Realms video games
Gold Box
Strategic Simulations games
Tactical role-playing video games
Video game franchises introduced in 1988